Popcorn chicken is a dish consisting of small, bite-sized pieces of chicken (about the size of popped corn kernels) that have been breaded and fried. The idea was originally developed by KFC in the 1990s but has since spread.

KFC 

Popcorn chicken was invented by food technologist Gene Gagliardi, who also invented Steak-umm. It was test-marketed in the United States from March 1992, and was launched nationwide by September of that year. It has been periodically available in KFC outlets. It was re-introduced in the US in 1998, and again in 2001. It was re-introduced once again in 2015, under the name "KFC Popcorn Nuggets".

It is also available in the UK, Ireland, Canada, Australia, Malaysia, Singapore, New Zealand and Greece. As of 2018, it is also available in the Netherlands and Belgium; it has been available in France and Italy since 2019.  It is also available in India, where it is marketed as "Chicken Popcorn".

See also
Taiwanese fried chicken
 List of deep fried foods
Popcorn
Popcorn shrimp

References

KFC
Products introduced in 1992
American chicken dishes
Convenience foods
Fast food
Deep fried foods
Fried chicken